Tamarine Tanasugarn was the defending champion, but lost in the semifinals to Stefanie Vögele.

Vögele won the tournament, defeating Kimiko Date-Krumm in the final, 7–6(7–3), 6–4.

Seeds

Main draw

Finals

Top half

Bottom half

References 
 Main draw

Dunlop World Challenge - Women's Singles
2012 Women's Singles
2012 Dunlop World Challenge